Daniel Hilliard (1824 – June 23, 1888) was an Ontario merchant and political figure. He represented Lanark North in the Legislative Assembly of Ontario as a Liberal member from 1886 to 1888.

He was born in Prescott and was educated in local schools there and in Toronto. Hilliard was a timber merchant in Pakenham. He married Jane Dickson, the sister of his partner, William Dickson. He supported the prohibition of alcohol. Hilliard died in office in 1888.

The Township of Hilliard, Ontario, was named after him.

References

External links 
The Canadian parliamentary companion, 1887 JA Gemmill

1824 births
1888 deaths
Ontario Liberal Party MPPs
Canadian businesspeople in timber